Tonny Bruins Slot (1 April 1947 – 1 November 2020) was a Dutch association football coach who was well known for his analysis of matches and opponents.

Career 
Tonny Bruins Slot was coach of FC Amsterdam from 1978 to 1980 and assistant-coach of Ajax, also in Amsterdam, from 1982 to 1988. Bruins Slot was the assistant of Aad de Mos at Ajax. In 1985, Bruins Slot was briefly the head coach of AFC Ajax, after Aad de Mos stepped down in May 1985 due to conflicts with the board of administration. Bruins Slot became head coach for the final five matches of the season, winning the Eredivisie title in the 1984–85 season, with players such as Frank Rijkaard, Ronald Koeman, Gerald Vanenburg, John van 't Schip, Marco van Basten, Rob de Wit and John Bosman. From the second half of 1985 until January 1988, Bruins Slot was the assistant of Johan Cruijff at Ajax, winning the European Cup Winners' Cup in 1987.

From 1988 to 1996, Bruins Slot was the right-hand man of Johan Cruijff at FC Barcelona, achieving great success, winning the UEFA Champions League (1992) and four national titles (1991–1994).

Afterwards Ronald Koeman made use of his knowledge, working with Koeman at Ajax, Benfica, and during the 2007–08 season for PSV Eindhoven. When Koeman joined Valencia as the club's newly appointed head coach, he took Bruins Slot with him.

On 17 May 2009, back in the Netherlands, Tonny Bruins Slot took a position as an assistant manager at AZ from Alkmaar, where he was responsible for the tactical analysis of the opponents. On 5 December of the same year, he and head coach Ronald Koeman were both dismissed.

Bruins Slot was a member of the board of AFC Ajax. On 21 December 2011, Bruins Slot was appointed to the Executive Board of the club, along with five other candidates.

On 26 January 2011, it was announced that Bruins Slot would take the position as an analyst of the next opponent for Ajax Amsterdam. He made team reports of the next opponents for head coach Frank de Boer.

On 1 November 2020, Bruins Slot died at the age of 73.

Honours

Manager
 Ajax
Eredivisie (1): 1984–85

Assistant manager
Ajax
 UEFA Cup Winners' Cup (1): 1986–87
 Eredivisie (3): 1982–83, 2001–02, 2003–04 
 KNVB Cup (4): 1982–83, 1985–86, 1986–87, 2001–02  
 Johan Cruijff Shield (1): 2002
 Amsterdam Tournament (6): 1985, 1987, 2001, 2002, 2003, 2004

 Barcelona
 European Cup (1): 1991–92
 UEFA Cup Winners' Cup (1): 1988–89
 UEFA Super Cup (1): 1992
 La Liga (4): 1990–91, 1991–92, 1992–93, 1993–94 
 Copa del Rey (1): 1989–90
 Supercopa de España (3): 1991, 1992, 1994

 Benfica
 Supertaça Cândido de Oliveira (1): 2005

 PSV
 Eredivisie (1): 2006–07

References

1947 births
2020 deaths
AFC Ajax managers
AFC Ajax non-playing staff
Dutch football managers
Sportspeople from Amsterdam